Bulandi may refer to:

Bulandi (1990 film), a Pakistani Urdu film
Bulandi (2000 film), an Indian Hindi film